Valentín Gómez Farías is a town and seat of the Gómez Farías Municipality, in the northern Mexican state of Chihuahua.  As of 2010, the town had a population of 5,330.

It is named after Valentín Gómez Farías.

References

Populated places in Chihuahua (state)